= Russian Olympics =

Russian Olympics may refer to:

- 1980 Summer Olympics, an Olympics held in Moscow, Russia, as well as Leningrad, Kiev, and Minsk
- 2014 Winter Olympics, an Olympics held in Sochi, Russia in 2014 and surrounding locales
